The Yamaha DragStar 250 (also known as the V Star 250 and the XVS250) is a motorcycle produced by Yamaha Motor Company.

V Star 250 Replaces Virago 250
In the 2008 model overview, the Virago 250 has been replaced with the V Star 250, but the specifications remain similar to the Virago 250.

See also 
Yamaha DragStar
 Yamaha DragStar 650 - XVS650/XVS650A
 Yamaha DragStar 1100 - XVS1100/XVS1100A

External links 
Yamaha Motor Co. global site
Yamaha Cruiser Australian Site
Yamaha Star Motorcycles USA Site

Drag Star 250